Marcus "Max" Dwinger (31 July 1870 – 12 August 1939) was a Dutch fencer. He competed in the individual épée event at the 1908 Summer Olympics. His grandson fenced at the 1960 Summer Olympics.

References

1870 births
1939 deaths
Dutch male fencers
Olympic fencers of the Netherlands
Fencers at the 1908 Summer Olympics
Sportspeople from Leeuwarden